Chudovy svit (Wonderful World) is the sixth studio album by Vopli Vidopliassova, and the first in seven years since Buly denky. The album was released on 18 October 2013.

Before the album's release, the songs "Lado", "Chio Chio San" and "Vidpustka" were released as singles. Vidpustka and Chio Chio San predate the album: Vidpustka shares its melody with a song called "Konspekt" released in 1987 on Vopli Vidopliassova's first album Hai zhyve VV! and Chio Chio San was recorded in 1989 during the Hey, O.K sessions but was not included on the final album, however an 8-track rehearsal tape circulates.

Track list

External links 
 Chudovy svit at Discogs
 Full lyrics at the Kraina Mriy website

2013 albums
Vopli Vidopliassova albums